Harold Kenneth Rosewarne (13 August 1930 – 9 March 2018) was an Australian rules footballer who played with South Melbourne in the Victorian Football League (VFL).

Notes

External links 

1930 births
2018 deaths
Australian rules footballers from Victoria (Australia)
Sydney Swans players